Mount Ommaney is an electoral district of the Legislative Assembly in the Australian state of Queensland. It was created with the 1992 redistribution.

It covers the western suburbs of Brisbane south of the Brisbane River. The Western Arterial Road runs through the middle of the seat from north to south. The suburb is split by the industrial suburb of Seventeen Mile Rocks between the older suburbs around Corinda in the east and the more recent areas around Mount Ommaney.

A significant population of elderly voters are found in the Sinnamon Village retirement complex in Sinnamon Park.

Members for Mount Ommaney

Election results

Suburbs in Mount Ommaney
 Corinda
 Jamboree Heights
 Jindalee
 Middle Park
 Mount Ommaney
 Oxley
 Riverhills
 Seventeen Mile Rocks
 Sinnamon Park
 Westlake

References

External links
 
 

Mount Ommaney